The 2008 PapaJohns.com Bowl was the third edition of the college football bowl game, and was played at Legion Field in Birmingham, Alabama.  The game was played starting at 2 PM US CST on Monday, December 29, 2008. The game, telecast on ESPN, pitted the Rutgers Scarlet Knights against the North Carolina State Wolfpack.

The game marked the first ever meeting of the two universities' football programs. NC State led 17-6 at halftime, but crumbled in the second half after losing starting quarterback Russell Wilson to a knee injury. Rutgers won, 29-23.

This was also the first edition of the bowl game not to feature any current or former members of Conference USA. The selection of NC State did have a connection to past bowl games in Birmingham as the Wolfpack had competed in the last All-American Bowl, which was also held at Legion Field in 1990.

Scoring summary

References

PapaJohns.com Bowl
Birmingham Bowl
NC State Wolfpack football bowl games
Rutgers Scarlet Knights football bowl games
PapaJohns.com Bowl